Felix Brannigan (1844 - June 10, 1907) was an Irish soldier who received the Medal of Honor for valor during the American Civil War.

Biography
Brannigan enlisted in the Army from Pittsburgh, Pennsylvania in April 1861. He was assigned to the 74th New York Volunteer Infantry Regiment and was promoted to First Sergeant in June 1862, but was reduced in rank to Private in October. He transferred to the 40th New York Infantry in August 1864, and was later commissioned as an officer in the 103rd US Colored Infantry. He received the Medal of Honor on June 29, 1866 for his actions at the Battle of Chancellorsville.

Medal of Honor citation
Citation:

Volunteered on a dangerous service and brought in valuable information.

See also

List of American Civil War Medal of Honor recipients: A-F

References

External links
Military Times
Arlington National Cemetery

1844 births
1907 deaths
Union Army officers
United States Army Medal of Honor recipients
American Civil War recipients of the Medal of Honor